Nigel Geoffrey Charles Cowley (born 1 March 1953) is a former English cricketer who played for Dorset, before finding fame with Glamorgan and Hampshire. He was born in Dorset.

External links

1953 births
Living people
English cricketers
Glamorgan cricketers
Hampshire cricketers
English cricket umpires
Dorset cricketers
People from Shaftesbury
Cricketers from Dorset
Devon cricketers